Charlotte May Pierstorff (May 12, 1908 – April 25, 1987) was shipped alive through the United States postal system by parcel post on February 19, 1914. After the incident, parcel post regulations were changed to prohibit the shipment of humans.

In 1997, Michael O. Tunnell wrote a children's book, Mailing May, revolving around May's childhood.

Mailing
On February 19, 1914, then five-year-old Charlotte May Pierstorff was mailed from Grangeville, Idaho to Lewiston, Idaho to visit her grandmother C. G. Vennigerholz, as this was cheaper than buying a train ticket.

Leonard Mochel, May's mother's cousin and railway postal clerk, accompanied her during the trip and delivered her to her grandmother's house.

This event indirectly caused the United States Post Office to bar all humans and live animals from mail delivery with the exception of bees, day-old poultry and a few other exceptions.

References

External links
Postal Museum page
Michael O. Tunnell's Mailing May

1908 births
1987 deaths